The Father is a 2019 Bulgarian drama film directed by Kristina Grozeva and Petar Valchanov. The film premiered at the 54th Karlovy Vary International Film Festival where it won the Crystal Globe award for best film. It was selected as the Bulgarian entry for the Best International Feature Film at the 93rd Academy Awards.

Plot
Vasil has just lost his long-time partner in life, his wife Valentina. His son, advertising photographer Pavel, who has driven out to his childhood hometown from the city where he works, arrives late to her funeral. Sidling apologetically to the graveside through the thicket of more respectful mourners, he joins his stiffly resentful father Vasil by the open casket. And then his phone, set to a frog-ribbit ringtone, goes off in his pocket. When a woman at the funeral proclaims that the dead woman called her cell phone, Vasil seeks out the help of a well-known psychic in order to contact his wife.

With the very best of intentions, Pavel has lied to everybody: to Vasil about the reason for his wife's absence from the funeral; to his wife, whom he only speaks to on the phone, about where he is and why; and to his assistant at work who is running down the clock on an advertising job with a tricky client. The evasions and falsehoods snow down thicker when Vasil’s unexpected interest in the gimcrackery of a local guru/charlatan, who claims to be able to commune with the dead, means that Pavel has to delay his return. Pavel tries to bring him to his senses, but Vasil stubbornly insists on doing things his own way. Eventually Pavel is trapped in a blizzard of white lies.

Cast
Ivan Barnev as Pavel
Ivan Savov as Vasil
Tanya Shahova as Lyubka
Hristofor Nedkov as Doctor
Margita Gosheva as Kalina
Ivanka Bratoeva as Valentina
Maria Bakalova as young Valentina

Reception

Critical response
On Rotten Tomatoes, the film has an approval rating of 100% based on 14 reviews, with an average rating of 7.4/10.

Jessica Kiang for Variety noted that the film "occupies a lighter, gentler register" than Grozeva and Valchanov's previous works and called it their "most pleasantly accessible film to date". Writing for Screen Daily, Demetrios Matheou found The Father to be "a supremely well-honed comedy, segueing between farce and satire". Anna Smith of Deadline Hollywood praised the film's comedic timing, but critiqued the lack of presence of its female characters. The Hollywood Reporter's Stephen Dalton described the film as a "humane, compassionate, character-driven delight".

Accolades

See also
List of submissions to the 93rd Academy Awards for Best International Feature Film
List of Bulgarian submissions for the Academy Award for Best International Feature Film

References

External links

2019 drama films
Films about funerals
Films about psychic powers
Bulgarian drama films
2010s Bulgarian-language films
Crystal Globe winners